Jarred Bairstow (born 5 November 1992) is an Australian professional basketball player for the Hobart Chargers of the NBL1 South. He is also contracted with the Tasmania JackJumpers of the National Basketball League (NBL). He played three seasons of college basketball in the United States for the Central Oklahoma Bronchos before returning to Australia and spending the 2016–17 season as a development player with his hometown Brisbane Bullets in the NBL. He previously played nine seasons across the Queensland Basketball League (QBL) and Queensland State League (QSL), and spent the 2020–21 NBL season with the Perth Wildcats.

Early life
Bairstow was born Brisbane, Queensland. He attended Brisbane's Anglican Church Grammar School and grew up supporting the Brisbane Bullets in the NBL. Between 2010 and 2012, he played in the Queensland Basketball League (QBL) for the Brisbane Capitals. He was named the team's MVP for the 2012 season.

College career
In 2013, Bairstow moved to the United States to play college basketball for the Central Oklahoma Bronchos in the NCAA Division II. In his first season, he averaged 6.8 points and 5.4 rebounds in 11 games with nine starts. In the 2014–15 season, he averaged 4.9 points and 3.1 rebounds while playing in all 30 games with seven starts. In the 2015–16 season, he averaged 8.9 points and 4.5 rebounds in 30 games with 24 starts. He scored a career-high 24 points on 1 March 2016 against Central Missouri.

Professional career
After playing for the South West Metro Pirates in the QBL in 2015 and 2016, Bairstow joined the Brisbane Bullets as a development player for the 2016–17 NBL season. He thus teamed up with his brother Cameron at the Bullets. He played four games for the Bullets during the season.

Bairstow played three more seasons for the South West Metro Pirates in the QBL between 2017 and 2019. He returned to the Brisbane Capitals in 2020 and helped them win the Queensland State League (QSL).

On 9 December 2020, Bairstow signed with the Perth Wildcats for the 2020–21 NBL season as an injury replacement for Majok Majok. He was deactivated from the roster on 6 May 2021 following the Wildcats' signing of Will Magnay. He returned to the active roster later that month following the season-ending injury to Bryce Cotton. He played 38 games, starting in 17, and averaged 1.9 points, 2.7 rebounds and 0.9 assists per game.

In June 2021, Bairstow joined the Sunshine Coast Phoenix of the NBL1 North.

On 7 July 2021, Bairstow signed a three-year contract with the Tasmania JackJumpers, a team entering the NBL for the first time in 2021–22. After playing for the Hobart Chargers in the 2022 NBL1 South season, he returned to the JackJumpers for the 2022–23 NBL season. He re-joined the Chargers for the 2023 NBL1 South season.

Personal life
Bairstow has six siblings. His older brother is former NBA player Cameron Bairstow. His sister Stephanie Bairstow is a former WNBL player.

References

External links
Central Oklahoma Bronchos player bio

1992 births
Living people
Australian expatriate basketball people in the United States
Australian men's basketball players
Basketball players from Brisbane
Brisbane Bullets players
Central Oklahoma Bronchos men's basketball players
People educated at Anglican Church Grammar School
Perth Wildcats players
Power forwards (basketball)
Tasmania JackJumpers players